Kotri Barrage, also known as the Ghulam Muhammad Barrage, is a barrage on the Indus River between Jamshoro and Hyderabad in the Sindh province of Pakistan. The barrage was completed in 1955 and was inaugurated by Ghulam Muhammad. It is used to control water flow in the Indus for irrigation and flood control purposes.

It is a gate-controlled weir type barrage with a navigation lock. It feeds Fulleli, Pinyari, and Kalri Baghar Canals.

See also
 List of barrages and headworks in Pakistan
 List of dams and reservoirs in Pakistan

References

Geography of Sindh
Dams in Pakistan
Barrages (dam)
Irrigation in Pakistan
Dams completed in 1955
Dams on the Indus River
1955 establishments in Pakistan